Georg Wilhelm Pabst (25 August 1885 – 29 May 1967) was an Austrian film director and screenwriter. He started as an actor and theater director, before becoming one of the most influential German-language filmmakers during the Weimar Republic.

Early years
Pabst was born in Raudnitz, Bohemia, Austria-Hungary (today's Roudnice nad Labem, Czech Republic), the son of a railroad official. While growing up in Vienna, he studied drama at the Academy of Decorative Arts and initially began his career as a stage actor in Switzerland, Austria and Germany. In 1910, Pabst traveled to the United States, where he worked as an actor and director at the German Theater in New York City.

In 1914, he decided to become a director, and he returned to recruit actors in Europe. Pabst was in France when World War I began, he was arrested and held as an enemy alien and interned in a prisoner-of-war camp near Brest. While imprisoned, Pabst organised a theatre group at the camp and directed French-language plays. Upon his release in 1919, he returned to Vienna, where he became director of the Neue Wiener Bühne, an avant-garde theatre.

Career
Pabst began his career as a film director at the behest of Carl Froelich who hired Pabst as an assistant director. He directed his first film, The Treasure, in 1923. He developed a talent for "discovering" and developing the talents of actresses, including Greta Garbo, Asta Nielsen, Louise Brooks, and Leni Riefenstahl.

Pabst's best known films concern the plight of women, including The Joyless Street (1925) with Greta Garbo and Asta Nielsen, Secrets of a Soul (1926) with Lili Damita, The Loves of Jeanne Ney (1927) with Brigitte Helm, and Pandora's Box (1929) and Diary of a Lost Girl (1929) with American actress Louise Brooks. He also co-directed with Arnold Fanck a mountain film entitled The White Hell of Pitz Palu (1929) starring Leni Riefenstahl.

After the coming of sound, he made a trilogy of films that secured his reputation: Westfront 1918 (1930), The Threepenny Opera (1931) with Lotte Lenya (based on the Bertolt Brecht and Kurt Weill musical), and Kameradschaft (1931). Pabst also filmed three versions of Pierre Benoit's novel L'Atlantide in 1932, in German, English, and French, titled Die Herrin von Atlantis, The Mistress of Atlantis, and L'Atlantide, respectively. In 1933, Pabst directed Don Quixote, once again in German, English, and French versions.

After making A Modern Hero (1934) in the USA and Street of Shadows (1937) in France, Pabst (who was planning to emigrate to the United States) was caught in France in 1939, when war was declared, whilst visiting his mother, and was forced to return to Nazi Germany. Under the auspices of propaganda minister, Josef Goebbels, Pabst made two films in Germany during this period: The Comedians (1941) and Paracelsus (1943).

Pabst directed four opera productions in Italy in 1953: La forza del destino for the Maggio Musicale Fiorentino in Florence (conducted by Dimitri Mitropoulos, the cast included Renata Tebaldi, Fedora Barbieri, Mario del Monaco, Aldo Protti, Cesare Siepi), and a few weeks later, for the Arena di Verona Festival, a spectacular Aïda, with Maria Callas in the title role (conducted by Tullio Serafin, with del Monaco), Il trovatore and again La forza del destino.

He directed The Last Ten Days (1955), the first post-war German feature film to feature Adolf Hitler as a character.

Death
On 29 May 1967, Pabst died in Vienna at the age of 81. He was interred at the Zentralfriedhof in Vienna.

Awards
 1941, Venice Film Festival: Gold Medal of the Biennale for Best Director for his film The Comedians

Filmography

 
 The Treasure (1923)
 Countess Donelli (1924)
 Joyless Street (1925)
 Secrets of a Soul (1926)
 One Does Not Play with Love (1926)
 The Love of Jeanne Ney (1927)
 The Devious Path (1928)
 Pandora's Box (1929)
 Diary of a Lost Girl (1929)
 The White Hell of Pitz Palu (dir. Arnold Fanck, 1929)
 Westfront 1918 (1930)
 Scandalous Eva (1930)
 Morals at Midnight (dir. Marc Sorkin, 1930)
 The Threepenny Opera (1931) two versions: German and French
 Kameradschaft (1931)
 L'Atlantide (1932) three versions: German, French, and English
 Don Quixote (1933) three versions: German, French, and English
 High and Low (1933)
 Cette nuit-là (1933)
 A Modern Hero (1934)
 Street of Shadows (1937)
 The Shanghai Drama (1938)
 Girls in Distress (1939)
 The Comedians (1941)
 Paracelsus (1943)
 Der Fall Molander (1945)
 The Trial (1948)
 Mysterious Shadows (1949)
 Duel with Death (1949)
 Call Over the Air (dir. Georg C. Klaren, 1951)
 Voice of Silence (1953)
 Cose da pazzi (1953)
 The Confession of Ina Kahr (1954)
 The Last Ten Days (1955)
 Jackboot Mutiny (1955)
 Ballerina (1956)
 Through the Forests and Through the Trees (1956)

See also
Max Deutsch, composer

References
Notes

Further reading

 Amengual, Barthélémy. G.W. Pabst. Paris, Seghers, 1966
 Atwell, Lee. G.W. Pabst. Boston, Twayne Publishers, 1977
 Baxter, John. "G.W. Pabst" in International Directory of Films and Filmmakers. Chicago, 1990. pp. 376–378
 Groppali, Enrico. Georg W. Pabst. Firenze, La Nuova Italia, 1983
 Jacobsen, Wolfgang (ed.) G.W. Pabst. Berlin, Argen, 1997
 Kagelmann, Andre and Keiner, Reinhold. "Lässig beginnt der Tod, Mensch und Tier zu ernten: Überlegungen zu Ernst Johannsens Roman Vier von der Infanterie und G. W. Pabsts Film Westfront 1918" in Johannsen, Eric; Kassell (ed.) Vier von der Infanterie. Ihre letzen Tage an der Westfront 1918. Media Net-Edition, 2014. S. 80-113. 
 Kracauer, Siegfried. De Caligari à Hitler. Une histoire psychologique du cinéma allemand, Paris, Flammarion, 1987
 Mitry, Jean. Histoire du cinéma: Art et industrie (5 volumes) Paris, Editions Universitaires – J.P. Delarge, 1967–1980
 Rentschler, Eric (ed.) The Films of G.W. Pabst. An extraterritorial cinema. New Brunswick, Rutgers University Press, 1990
 Pabst, Georg Wilhelm. "Servitude et grandeur de Hollywood" in Le rôle intellectuel du cinéma, Paris, SDN-Institut International de Coopération Intellectuelle, 1937. pp. 251–255
 Van den Berghe, Marc. La mémoire impossible. Westfront 1918 de G.W. Pabst. Grande Guerre, soldats, automates. Le film et sa problématique vus par la 'Petite Illustration' (1931), Bruxelles, 200

External links

 
 "The Other Eye", Filmessay on G.W.Pabst, by Hannah Heer & Werner Schmiedel (A/USA 1991/92)

1885 births
1967 deaths
20th-century Austrian male actors
Austrian film directors
Austrian male stage actors
Austrian theatre directors
Burials at the Vienna Central Cemetery
English-language film directors
French-language film directors
Male actors from Vienna
Mountaineering film directors
Austrian opera directors
People from Roudnice nad Labem
Silent film directors
World War I prisoners of war held by France
Austro-Hungarian prisoners of war in World War I
20th-century Austrian screenwriters
20th-century Austrian male writers